George Hogben  (14 July 1853 – 26 April 1920) was a New Zealand educationalist and seismologist. He was born in Islington, Middlesex, England on 14 July 1853, and died after a short illness at home in Khandallah, Wellington . He was Inspector-General of Schools in New Zealand and was appointed CMG in the 1915 New Year Honours.

References
 

1853 births
1920 deaths
New Zealand Companions of the Order of St Michael and St George
New Zealand educators
19th-century New Zealand geologists
People from Islington (district)
English emigrants to New Zealand
20th-century New Zealand geologists